Point Last Seen is an American television film that originally aired on November 24, 1998. Linda Hamilton, Kevin Kilner and Sam Hennings star in the film. The film is based on the book Point Last Seen: A Woman Tracker's Story by Hannah Nyala.

Plot
A woman feels abandoned by the justice system when her aggressive husband kidnaps their two children. Embittered, she withdraws into the desert, where she becomes a tracker for missing people. When a woman's daughter disappears, she is again confronted with her own emotions.

Cast
Linda Hamilton as Rachel Harrison
Kevin Kilner as Kevin Harrison
Sam Hennings as Frank
Kieren van den Blink as Young Rachel
Mary Kay Place as Coreen Davis
Kory Thompson as Jon
Holly Belnap as Ruthie
Dana Reilly as Mrs. Ellis
Nicole Barrera as Mandy Ellis
Joseph Adams as Jason
Johann Benét as Jake
Joel Cooper as Bailiff
Kara Darland as Young Ruthie
Sanford Gibbons as Sheriff Don

Production
The film was shot on Gold Canyon, Arizona from September 28 to October 21, 1998.

Reception
David Parkinson for Radio Times gave the film three out of five stars, praising Linda Hamilton's performance, saying "Linda Hamilton gives a credible performance", but criticized that the story "is somewhat diminished by the lowbrow TV-movie approach that includes corny flashbacks."

Writing for Variety, Laura Fries gave the film a positive review, with her summary reading, "Although this movie touches on familiar themes often exploited in the movie of the week genre, 'Point Last Seen' is by no means your typical woman in jeopardy pic. Deliberately paced, this drama benefits from Ronni Kern's intelligent script, based on the nonfiction book by Hannah Nyala, and an understated but emotional performance by Linda Hamilton."

References

External links

1998 films
1998 television films
1996 drama films
Films about domestic violence
Films about missing people
Films shot in Arizona
American drama television films
1990s English-language films
1990s American films